Procalypta is a monotypic moth genus in the subfamily Arctiinae erected by Arthur Gardiner Butler in 1876. Is single species, Procalypta subcyanea, was first described by Francis Walker in 1854. It is found in Mexico, Costa Rica and Panama.

Subspecies
Procalypta subcyanea subcyanea
Procalypta subcyanea victorina Druce, 1884 (Costa Rica, Panama)

References

Arctiinae